Huang Xiling (24 April 1927 – 16 June 2021) was a Chinese geotechnical specialist and an academician of the Chinese Academy of Engineering (CAE).

Biography
Huang was born in Zhongxiang County, Hubei, on 24 April 1927. In 1933 he attended the Methodist Primary School, a church school in Hankou. He secondary studied at Jiangjin National 9th High School in the neighboring Chongqing city. In 1945, he was admitted to National Central University, majoring in the Department of Civil Engineering. After graduating in 1949, he was dispatched to the Nanjing Military Control Commission. After a short year in the Infrastructure Division of Northeast Planning Commission, he was transferred to Northeast Construction Bureau as secretary of the director. In January 1955, he was sent to study at the Moscow State University of Civil Engineering on government scholarships. He returned to China in January 1959 and joined the Science and Technology Committee of the Ministry of Construction (now Ministry of Housing and Urban-Rural Development). In January 2005, he moved to the China Academy of Building Research, where he successively served as its vice president and president. He died of illness in Beijing, on 16 June 2021, aged 94.

Works

Honours and awards
 1995 Member of the Chinese Academy of Engineering (CAE)

References

1927 births
2021 deaths
People from Zhongxiang
Engineers from Hubei
National Central University alumni
Moscow State University alumni
Members of the Chinese Academy of Engineering